The Daniel and Henrik Sedin Award is an annual award of  the Vancouver Canucks of the National Hockey League (NHL) presented to the player who best exemplifies community leadership. The current holder of the award is forward Brandon Sutter, who won it in the 2021–22 NHL season.

List of winners

 Player is still active with the Canucks.

See also
Babe Pratt Trophy
Cyrus H. McLean Trophy
Fred J. Hume Award
Pavel Bure Most Exciting Player Award

References

Vancouver Canucks trophies and awards